Destiny of Kings is a 1986 adventure module for the Advanced Dungeons & Dragons fantasy role-playing game.

Plot summary

In Destiny of Kings, an assassin kills the King of Andevar, and the King's brother seizes power. A loyal retainer hires the player characters to find the missing prince, who is held by agents of the usurper. They are charged with bringing him back to claim the throne.The module includes descriptions of a citadel, a castle, an abbey and an inn.

King Halfred of Dunador has died in a mysterious accident. As the heir has disappeared, the wicked Lord Edrin intends to seize the throne. Hollend, head of the Royal Council, asks the player characters to seek out the missing Prince. The characters must contend with scheming Dukes, raiders and corpses as they trace the pilgrimage the Prince took before the King's death. They must uncover and rectify ignoble deeds, bringing traitors to justice.

Publication history
N3 Destiny of Kings was published by TSR in 1986, as a 32-page booklet with an outer folder. The module was written by Stephen Bourne, with cover art by Keith Parkinson and interior art by James Roslof. The module includes a fold-out cover including a color area map.

In 1998 the module was re-released for 2nd Edition AD&D.

Reception

Graham Staplehurst reviewed Destiny of Kings for White Dwarf #80, calling it "a well-planned adventure for a medium-sized, low-level AD&D party”. He considered the adventure particularly appropriate for an inexperienced or novice party, as very experienced players "may find it a little sparse on the intrigue and cloak-and-dagger side". Staplehurst found a few bugs in the text, although he felt the module was well introduced, with useful aids such as a glossary of names and places and a plot synopsis. He felt that the random encounters were overpowered, and noted a walled town of "ludicrous design, containing a jousting field just 130' long". He concluded the review by describing the module as, "Overall, a well-thought out adventure that shouldn't be too hard to slot into an existing campaign, and would make a very good introduction for new players."

References

Dungeons & Dragons modules
Role-playing game supplements introduced in 1986